St Simon Zelotes is a traditional conservative evangelical Church of England church in Milner Street, Chelsea, London, England.

It was built in 1858–59, designed by the architect Joseph Peacock, and is his "most complete surviving work".

It has been grade II* listed since 1954.

References

Chelsea, London
Churches completed in 1859
Grade II* listed churches in London
Grade II* listed buildings in the Royal Borough of Kensington and Chelsea
19th-century Church of England church buildings
Church of England church buildings in the Royal Borough of Kensington and Chelsea